Jim Ahmat is an Australian former professional rugby league footballer.

Playing career
Ahmat played four matches for the North Queensland Cowboys in the 1997 and 1998 seasons.

Ahmat played the 2009 season with team Moranbah in the Mackay & District Rugby League.

References

1978 births
Living people
Australian rugby league players
North Queensland Cowboys players
Place of birth missing (living people)
Rugby league five-eighths
Rugby league fullbacks
Rugby league wingers